The Charter of Grenoble is a founding document of the movement of student unionism. It was written by the National Union of Students of France, at the Congress of Grenoble in 1946.

Text of the charter 

Preamble

Representatives of the French students, legally brought together with the national Congress in Grenoble on April 24, 1946, conscious of the historical value of the time;

-Where the French Union works out the new declaration of the rights of man and of the Citizen

-Where is built the peaceful Statute of the Nations

-Where the world of work and youth releases the bases of an economic and social revolution to the service of the man

-Affirm their will to take part in the unanimous effort of rebuilding,

-Faithful to the traditional objectives by youth French coed when it was with the highest conscience of its mission,

-Faithful to the example of best of them, died in the fight of the French people for his freedom

-Noting the out-of-date character of the institutions which govern them

-State to want to place itself, as they did so often during our History, with the avant-garde of French youth, while defining as bases of their tasks and their claims the following principles:

Article 1: The student is a young intellectual worker.

Rights and duties of the student as a young person:

Article 2: As a young person the student has right to a particular social welfare, in the fields physique, intellectual and moral.

Article 3: As a young person the student has the duty to be integrated into the whole of world youth.

Rights and duties of the student as a worker:

Article 4: As a worker, the student has right to work and rest under the best conditions and material independence, as well personal as social, guaranteed by the free exercise of the trade-union rights.

Article 5: As a worker, the student has the duty to acquire the best technical skill.

Rights and duties of the student as an intellectual:

Article 6: As an intellectual, the student has the right to research of the truth and the freedom which is the condition first.

Article 7: As an intellectual, the student has the duty:To define, propagate and defend the truth, which implies the duty to make divide and progress the culture and to release the direction of the History. To defend freedom any oppression counters, which, for the intellectual, constitutes the most crowned mission.

See also
 

Student activism
Student voice

References